Karshan Odedara is a Member of Legislative assembly from Kutiyana constituency in Gujarat for its 12th legislative assembly.

References

Gujarat MLAs 2007–2012
Bharatiya Janata Party politicians from Gujarat
Living people
Year of birth missing (living people)